Chris Jordan (born 1963) is an American artist, photographer and film producer based in Seattle, Washington.

Works
Many of Jordan's works are created from photographs of garbage and mass consumption, a serendipitous technique which started when he visited an industrial yard to look at patterns of color and order. Jordan uses everyday commonalities such as a plastic cup and defines the blind unawareness involved in American consumerism. His work, while often unsettling, is a message about unconscious behaviors in our everyday lives, leaving it to the viewer to draw conclusions about the inevitable consequences which will arise from our habits.

Jordan's work can be grouped in the following series:
 Intolerable Beauty: Portraits of American Mass Consumption (2003–2006) – A series of large format photographs depicting the magnitude of America's waste and consumption.
 In Katrina’s Wake: Portraits of Loss from an Unnatural Disaster (2005) – A series of photographs taken in 2005 depicting the aftermath of Hurricane Katrina.
 Running The Numbers I: An American Self Portrait (2006–2009) – A series of photographic mosaics depicting visualizations of statistics related to America's consumerism, social problems, and addictions.
 Running the Numbers II: Portraits of global mass culture

Midway project
Midway: Message from the Gyre (2009–2013) is a series of photographs depicting rotting carcasses of baby Laysan albatrosses filled with plastic. These birds nest on Midway Atoll and are being fed plastic by their parents, who find floating plastic in the middle of the ocean and mistake it for food. This is a part of an ongoing arts and media project called Midway Journey, which has its own website. 

In relation to the Midway photographs, Jordan created another project that was going to be a documentary. It was about the pollution on Midway Atoll called "The Midway Film Project". The project was successfully funded on Kickstarter in 2012 with over $100,000 worth of donations. By 2017, the film was finished and being screened in select locations.

See also 
 Of All The People In All The World – an art installation depicting similar statistics, using piles of rice

References

External links

 Website for the Midway Journey project
 Video: Chris Jordan presents his Midway work at Pop!Tech
 
 "Turning powerful stats into art" (TED2008)
 Midway - a film by Chris Jordan  on YouTube

American photographers
Environmental artists
1963 births
Living people
Sierra Club awardees